This is the results breakdown of the local elections held in the Balearic Islands on 27 May 2007. The following tables show detailed results in the autonomous community's most populous municipalities, sorted alphabetically.

Opinion polls

Ibiza polling

Overall

City control
The following table lists party control in the most populous municipalities, including provincial capitals (shown in bold). Gains for a party are displayed with the cell's background shaded in that party's colour.

Municipalities

Calvià

Ciutadella de Menorca
Population: 27,468

Ibiza
Population: 42,884

Inca
Population: 27,301

Llucmajor
Population: 31,381

Manacor
Population: 37,165

Maó-Mahón
Population: 27,893

Palma de Mallorca
Population: 375,048

Santa Eulària des Riu
Population: 27,152

Island Councils

See also
2007 Balearic regional election

Notes

References
Opinion poll sources

Other

Balearic Islands
2007